HD 85390 b (also known as HIP 48235 b) is an extrasolar planet which orbits the G-type main sequence star HD 85390, located approximately 106 light years away

The planet HD 85390 b is named Madalitso. The name was selected in the NameExoWorlds campaign by Zambia, during the 100th anniversary of the IAU. Madalitso means blessings in the native language of Nyanja in Zambia.

References 

Exoplanets discovered in 2009
Exoplanets detected by radial velocity
Giant planets
Vela (constellation)
Exoplanets with proper names